Lieutenant General Jasper Clayton (died 27 June 1743) was Governor of Gibraltar.

Military career
Born the son of Sir John Clayton and Alice (Bowyer) Clayton, Jasper Clayton lived at Fernhill in Buckinghamshire. He chose to join the army and climbed the ranks to become a lieutenant general. In 1707, during the War of the Spanish Succession, he was present at the Battle of Almansa.

In 1713 he was made colonel of the 14th Regiment of Foot. He commanded a brigade during the suppression of the 1715 Jacobite Rising in Scotland.

He was appointed Lieutenant-Governor of Gibraltar in 1727, remaining there until 1730. He fought in the War of Austrian Succession and was killed at the Battle of Dettingen in 1743. He is buried at Wingfield in Buckinghamshire.

References

Sources

1743 deaths
West Yorkshire Regiment officers
British Army lieutenant generals
Governors of Gibraltar
British military personnel of the War of the Spanish Succession
British Army personnel of the War of the Austrian Succession
British military personnel killed in the War of the Austrian Succession
Year of birth unknown